Brig. Gen. John Echols House is a historic home located at Union, Monroe County, West Virginia.  It was built between 1845 and 1848, and is a two-story, brick dwelling in the Greek Revival style. The house measures 44 feet, 6 inches, wide and 52 feet long. It features a hipped roof and prominent, exterior side chimneys. Also on the property is a frame, two-story house that appears to have been used for servant's quarters.  The house was owned for 20 years by Brig Gen. John Echols (1823–1896), a general in the Confederate States Army during the American Civil War.

It was listed on the National Register of Historic Places in 1985. It is located in the Union Historic District, listed in 1990.

References

Houses on the National Register of Historic Places in West Virginia
Greek Revival houses in West Virginia
Houses completed in 1848
Houses in Monroe County, West Virginia
National Register of Historic Places in Monroe County, West Virginia
Individually listed contributing properties to historic districts on the National Register in West Virginia